Adhurst (also known as Adhurst St Mary) is a hamlet in Hampshire, United Kingdom. Lothian Bonham-Carter of the Bonham Carter family was born in the hamlet in 1858.

Villages in Hampshire